Khadra is a town and commune in Mostaganem Province, Algeria. It may also refer to:

 Khadra', village in Libya
 Khadra (name), list of people with the name
 Khadra Palace, residence of the Umayyad caliphs in Damascus
 Khadra and the Southern Sinbad, 1952 Egyptian comedy film
 Al khadra', multiple settlements in Saudi Arabia
 Al-Khadra Mosque, place of prayer for Muslims in Nablus, Palestine
 Bab el Khadra, gate in Tunis, Tunisia
 Borj el-Khadra, settlement in Tunisia